The World Cat Federation (WCF) is an international association of cat clubs. It was founded in 1988 in the city of Rio de Janeiro, and continues to have a strong presence in Latin America, Western Europe, and in countries of the former USSR.  It is currently based in Germany.  There are 370 organizations worldwide associated to the WCF. The current president is Anneliese Hackmann from Essen.

Purpose
The WCF allows the breeders of affiliated clubs to register their kennel names internationally. They create standards for the 68 pedigreed breeds of cats recognized by the club. The WCF trains judges for exhibitions and organizes the examinations. Generally, the WCF is designed to promote international contacts of the cat clubs affiliated.

The WCF comprises over 10,000 breeders/catteries registered (not all are active members); 66 national organisations (plus 64 provisional); 370 clubs (over 500 counting sub-clubs) total pedigrees unknown (handled by clubs, not centralised); average of over 500 shows per year; 111 breeds listed as recognised or accepted (as of 2020); describes itself as "an international association of cat clubs ... successfully working on the development of animal protection laws in European Parliament in Strasbourg."

See also
List of cat breeds
List of cat registries

References

External links
Official Website

Animal breeding
Cat registries
Organizations established in 1988